Tall-e Asvad (also Romanized as Tal Asvad, Tal-e-Asvad, and Tel Aswad) is a village in Abdoliyeh-ye Sharqi Rural District, in the Central District of Ramshir County, Khuzestan Province, Iran. At the 2006 census, its population was 463, in 77 families.

References 

Populated places in Ramshir County